Pablo Daniel Abdala Schwarz (born 14 July 1966) is a Uruguayan lawyer and politician of the National Party (PN), serving as President of the Institute of Children and Adolescents of Uruguay (INAU) since 1 April 2020.

Born in Montevideo, Abdala attended Seminary College, graduated from University of the Republic, with a law degree.

Biography

Early life 
He is a son of Carlos Abdala, a politician and diplomat. Pablo lived part of his childhood in Paraguay, because his father served as Ambassador of Uruguay to that country. In his native country he attended the Ivy Thomas Memorial School and the Seminary College, completing their primary and secondary studies respectively.

Political career 
He has been a member of the National Party since 1982. He served as secretary of the Herrerism youth in 1988. One year later, he was appointed as the first candidate of the Herrerism faction for the Legislature of Montevideo. In the 2004 elections, he was elected national representative by list 71 in Montevideo. On February 15, 2005, he assumed as Deputy for the department of Montevideo for the 46th. Legislature (2005-2010). He was reelected for the 47th (2010-2015) and the 48th legislature (2015-2020).

In 2019, he supported the pre-candidate Jorge Larrañaga facing the presidential primaries and also integrates the "Live without Fear" Commission, promoting a referendum in search of improving public security in Uruguay. In 2020, he briefly held the Presidency of the National Party, between March 9 and 31. He succeeded Beatriz Argimón who took office as Vice President of the Republic and resigned after being appointed president of INAU.

From 1996 to 1998 he taught Political Science at the Military School.

References

1966 births
Living people
People from Montevideo
Uruguayan people of Lebanese descent
National Party (Uruguay) politicians
Members of the Chamber of Representatives of Uruguay (2005–2010)
Members of the Chamber of Representatives of Uruguay (2010–2015)
Members of the Chamber of Representatives of Uruguay (2015–2020)
University of the Republic (Uruguay) alumni
People educated at Ivy Thomas Memorial School